André Raffray (1925–2010) was a French graphic artist.

Raffray was born on 18 July 1925 at Nonancourt in Normandy. After studying under André Rigal, he earned a living by working from 1953 to 1982 in the entertainment department of the Gaumont Film Company.

Much of Raffray's work, who was particularly influenced by Marcel Duchamp, consisted in "finishing", "starting over", and reinterpreting the works of artists, like Monet's, Picasso's, etc., that served as an inspiration to him.

Raffray died at Paris on 6 January 2010.

External links
  André Raffray in the Joconde art database

20th-century French painters
20th-century French male artists
French male painters
21st-century French painters
21st-century French male artists
People from Évreux
1925 births
2010 deaths